The Office of the Public Guardian (OPG)  in England and Wales is a government body that, within the framework of the Mental Capacity Act 2005, polices the activities of deputies, attorneys and guardians who act to protect the financial affairs of people who lack the mental capacity for making decisions about such things. It is an  executive agency of the Ministry of Justice. The current Public Guardian and Chief Executive of the Office of the Public Guardian is Amy Holmes, replacing Stuart Howard, who acted as interim Public Guardian from April 2022 to July 2022.

The OPG was established on 1 October 2007, replacing the Public Guardianship Office (PGO). Initially located in London, most functions transferred to offices in Birmingham and Nottingham during 2009.

List of Public Guardians

See also
Office of the Public Guardian (Scotland)

References

External links 
Official website

Executive agencies of the United Kingdom government
2007 establishments in the United Kingdom
Government agencies established in 2007
Organisations based in Birmingham, West Midlands
Power of attorney